is a public holiday in Japan celebrated annually to honor elderly citizens. It started in 1966 as a national holiday and was held on every September 15. Since 2003, Respect for the Aged Day is held on the third Monday of September due to the Happy Monday System.

This national holiday traces its origins to 1947, when Nomadani-mura (later Yachiyo-cho, currently Taka-cho), Hyōgo Prefecture, proclaimed September 15 Old Folks' Day (Toshiyori no Hi). Its popularity spread nationwide, and in 1966 it took its present name and status. Annually, Japanese media take the opportunity to feature the elderly, reporting on the population and highlighting the oldest people in the country.

Commemorative silver sake cups
Since 1963, the Japanese government has given a commemorative silver sake cup to Japanese who reach the age of 100. In 1963, the number was 153, but with numbers increasing, the government decided to reduce the size of the cup to cut costs in 2009. In 2014, 29,357 received a cup. In 2017, Japan honored 32,097 people (27,461 women and 4,636 men) who turned 100 years old; they each received congratulatory letter and souvenir sake cup from the Prime Minister. According to this report the solid sterling silver cups were replaced with nickel alloy silver plated design which halved the per-unit cost, saving $1-million in the annual budget.

Celebration 
On this holiday, people return home to visit and pay respect to the elders. Some people volunteer in neighborhoods by making and distributing free lunch boxes to older citizens. Entertainment is sometimes provided by teenagers and children with various keirokai performances. Special television programs are also featured by Japanese media on this holiday.

References

External links
Senior Citizens Are Living Treasures 
Virtual Classroom: Respect-for-the-Aged Day
Respect for the Aged Day

1966 establishments in Japan
Public holidays in Japan
Old age in Japan
Recurring events established in 1966
September observances
Holidays and observances by scheduling (nth weekday of the month)
Monday